The Sun Throne, also known as the Peacock Throne, is the imperial throne of Iran. It has its name after a radiant sun disk on the headboard. The throne has the shape of a platform, similar to the Marble Throne in Golestan Palace. The Naderi Throne was constructed later and has the appearance of a chair. Since 1980 it has been displayed at Iran's Central Bank.

History 

It was constructed for Fath-Ali Shah Qajar, Shah of Persia, in the early nineteenth century and was used as the coronation throne from then onwards. He took Tavous Khanum Taj ol-Doleh as one of his consorts. In English, her name translates to Lady Peacock. The marriage ceremony took place on the throne, and Tavous Khanum became his favourite wife. Due to her name, the throne later received the name "Peacock Throne". It was also theorised that parts of the plundered Mughal Peacock Throne were re-used, such as the legs or other parts, however no conclusive proof exists. Nevertheless, in a metonymic sense, the term "Peacock Throne" also referred rhetorically initially in the West to the institution of the Persian monarchy.

Not a single element on the Sun Throne features a peacock. The Lion and Sun was the ancient symbol of kingship in Persia. When the Shah would be seated on the throne, he symbolised the lion, with the sun symbol behind his back. The Shah himself however could also be seen as the sun. The last Shah, Mohammad Reza Pahlavi, carried the title Aryamehr (Light of the Aryans), which was another connotation for the sun.

The throne was probably modeled after the older Marble Throne, with which it shares many features. The throne has the shape of a raised platform to which two stairs led. The steps feature allegories of fierce creatures. Around the platform is a golden railing inscribed with calligraphy with Koranic verses. In the middle of the platform the sovereign would take his seat elevated above the ground. This has strong connotations to the ancient Persian symbol Faravahar, the winged sun. The throne originally also featured two sculptured birds on either side of the sun, facing it. This added to the symbolism of the elevated, floating throne, occupying a place away from earth and towards heaven.

At the end of the nineteenth century, the sovereign started taking his place on the steps of the throne instead of in the middle of it.

Until 1980 the Sun Throne was located in the Mirror Hall of Golestan Palace. In 1980 it was decided to move it to the vaults of the Iranian Crown Jewels at Iran's Central Bank where it is now on display.

References

Further reading

External links 

 
 http://www.zar.ir/News/News-4872.aspx
 http://www.worldisround.com/articles/73022/photo658.html

Iranian National Jewels
Individual thrones
Tourist attractions in Tehran
Qajar Iran